Captain Richard Bogue (24 October 1782 – 18 October 1813) was an officer of the British Army, who commanded a Rocket Brigade company at the Battle of Leipzig, where he was killed.

Biography
Bogue was the youngest son of John Bogue, M.D., of Fareham, Hampshire, and was born at Titchfield, Hampshire on 24 October 1782. He entered the Royal Military Academy, Woolwich as a cadet on 31 January 1797, passing out as a second lieutenant of the Royal Artillery on 14 July 1798. He was then promoted to the rank of Lieutenant on 10 February 1800 and became a second captain on 18 March 1806. He was appointed to 'A' Troop Royal Horse Artillery in 1803, and transferred to 'B' Troop in 1804. 'B' Troop was sent to Spain in 1808, reaching Corunna on 9 November. This was the period of General Sir John Moore’s advance into Spain to confront Napoleon. 'B' Troop were present at the successful cavalry actions at Sahagún and Benavente, besides taking part in the Battle of Corunna.

Following the disappointing experimental field trials of Congreve rockets in 1807 and 1810, the first commitment by the Royal Artillery to the use of rockets was in September 1811. The Board of Ordnance placed a detachment of thirty-two men of the Royal Horse Artillery, under Second Captain Richard Bogue, at Congreve's disposal for further integrating rockets into the artillery. This detachment experimented with the weapon both at Woolwich and at Bagshot, helping Congreve refine his system for eventual use by horse artillery. On 7 June 1813 came orders designating Bogue's unit the "Rocket Brigade"  and recommending that it be brought up to full strength and tried in actual service. The Rocket Brigade landed at Wismar, in northern Germany, on 8 August and Bogue marched to join the Army of the North commanded by Crown Prince John of Sweden.

How the Rocket Brigade was brought into action on the third day of the Battle of Leipzig on 18 October 1813 is described in a letter which Lieutenant John Jones, aide-de-camp to Sir Charles Stewart, wrote to Captain Bogue’s father-in-law John Hanson.

Richard Bogue was buried in Taucha churchyard, four miles away from where he fell, and a stone monument was erected over his grave in 1815 by national subscription. This monument was restored in 1896, and again in 1930. In Tichfield church a commemorative plaque in his memory was placed in the choir, near the altar. In later years, the village of Taucha named a street in his memory. In January 1814, the Crown Prince of Sweden made Bogue posthumously a knight of the Swedish Royal Order of the Sword, and sent the cross to Captain Bogue's widow together with a gift of 10,000 dollars.

Notes

References 

Attribution:

External links 
 Photographs and article on his grave 
 —  A Public Domain publication

1782 births
1813 deaths
Royal Artillery officers
British Army personnel of the Napoleonic Wars
British military personnel killed in action in the Napoleonic Wars